The list of ship decommissionings in 1990 includes a chronological list of all ships decommissioned in 1990.


See also 

1990
 
Ship